Yulia Myasnikova (born 13 June 1993) is a Kazakhstani football defender currently playing in the Russian Women's Football Championship for CSKA Moscow, with which she has also played the Champions League. She is a member of the Kazakhstani national team.

International goals

References

1993 births
Living people
Kazakhstani women's footballers
Kazakhstan women's international footballers
Women's association football defenders
BIIK Kazygurt players
ZFK CSKA Moscow players
Expatriate women's footballers in Russia
Kazakhstani expatriate sportspeople in Russia